Edwin R. Chapman (born July 20, 1962 in Bellingham, Washington) is an American biochemist known for his work on Ca2+-triggered exocytosis. He currently serves as the Ricardo Miledi Professor of Neuroscience at the University of Wisconsin–Madison, where he is also an investigator of the Howard Hughes Medical Institute (HHMI).

Life and work 
Chapman received his Ph.D. from the University of Washington in Seattle, and conducted post-doctoral studies with Reinhard Jahn at the HHMI at Yale University. In 1996 he became an assistant professor in the Department of Physiology (later renamed Neuroscience) at the University of Wisconsin-Madison. In 2005, Chapman became a full professor and an HHMI Investigator.
 In 2018 he was named as the inaugural director of the Quantitative Membrane Biophysics Program at the UW-Madison.

Chapman has made important contributions in three related areas: the molecular mechanisms by which Ca2+ triggers exocytosis in neurons and neuroendocrine cells, the structure and dynamics of exocytotic fusion pores, and the mechanisms by which botulinum and tetanus neurotoxins act on neurons to block exocytosis. He pioneered the use of time resolved biochemical and biophysical methods to study protein•lipid and protein•protein interactions that mediate excitation-secretion coupling. His laboratory was the first to reconstitute Ca2+-triggered membrane fusion in vitro using purified components, and he has used this approach to make numerous crucial contributions concerning the mechanism by which proteins catalyze the merger of lipid bilayers. He is also a leader concerning our understanding of exocytotic fusion pores, using both cell- and nanodisc-based approaches to reveal their dynamics, composition, and structure. In parallel, his laboratory pioneered the identification of protein receptors for the clostridial neurotoxins, including “Botox”. Other major contributions include on-going studies to assign functions to orphaned synaptic vesicle proteins and to understand the function of all members of the synaptotagmin family of membrane trafficking proteins; this latter work has revealed a number of novel insights into synaptic plasticity.

Achievements 
Chapman has published more than 150 scientific research articles, and is listed on seven US-issued patents. He is the recipient of Shaw Scientist and Pew Scholar awards, and in 2019 he was given the Sir Bernard Katz Award, from the Biophysical Society, for his work on Ca2+ sensors and fusion pores.

Selected publications

References 

1962 births
Living people
Writers from Bellingham, Washington
University of Washington faculty
Howard Hughes Medical Investigators
University of Wisconsin–Madison faculty
21st-century American biochemists
20th-century American biochemists
University of Washington alumni
Scientists from Washington (state)
20th-century American male writers
21st-century American male writers
20th-century American writers